The Simon Sager Cabin is a historic log cabin on the campus of John Brown University in Siloam Springs, Arkansas.  Built in the 1830s, it is believed to be the very first homestead cabin built in northwestern Arkansas.  It is a single-story structure fashioned out of hand-hewn logs that have been squared and chamfered, and joined by notches, with the gaps filled by limestone chinking.  It originally was located downtown near the present-day city park, but was relocated to the John Brown University campus.

The cabin was listed on the National Register of Historic Places in 1976.

See also
National Register of Historic Places listings in Benton County, Arkansas

References

Houses on the National Register of Historic Places in Arkansas
Houses completed in 1835
Houses in Siloam Springs, Arkansas
National Register of Historic Places in Benton County, Arkansas